030 may refer to:

 Motorola 68030 
 BR-030
 Geographical telephone calling prefixes
 Greater Accra area code, Ghana
 Utrecht, Netherlands
 Berlin, Germany
 Bar Municipality and Ulcinj Municipality of Montenegro
 Province of Brescia, Italy
 030 (magazine), from Berlin